Neely Grove Branch is a stream in Andrew County in the U.S. state of Missouri. The precise location of the stream is unknown to the GNIS.

Neely Grove Branch was named after James Neely, a local pioneer.

See also
List of rivers of Missouri

References

Rivers of Andrew County, Missouri
Rivers of Missouri